The Powerscourt Covered Bridge is a covered bridge that takes the First Concession Road across the Chateauguay River in Hinchinbrooke, Quebec. It is also known as the Percy Bridge.

It was constructed in 1861, and employs the McCallum inflexible arched truss, developed by Daniel McCallum. It was the only McCallum truss bridge that was not a railway bridge, and since wooden truss railway bridges have all but been replaced with steel and concrete bridges, it is the last bridge of its kind in the world. In 2009 it was fully restored to its original 1861 plans.

It is supported on three masonry piers and the two spans are structurally independent of each other.

The Powerscourt Covered Bridge was designated a National Historic Site of Canada in 1984 because:
it is the only known example of a McCallum inflexible arched truss bridge still in existence;
it is one of the oldest covered bridges that exists in Canada.

The bridge was also named an Historic Monument of Quebec in 1987. It was documented by the U.S. Historic American Engineering Record in 2003 with assistance from Public Works and Government Services Canada.

See also
List of bridges in Canada
List of covered bridges in Quebec

References

External links

Road bridges in Quebec
Covered bridges in Canada
National Historic Sites in Quebec
Bridges on the National Historic Sites of Canada register
Heritage buildings of Quebec
Bridges in Montérégie
Bridges completed in 1861
Le Haut-Saint-Laurent Regional County Municipality